Nono Ku, born as Ku Kuan-yun, is a Taiwanese actress and model.

Filmography

Television series

References

External links

 
 
 

1992 births
21st-century Taiwanese actresses
Actresses from Taipei
Living people
Taiwanese female models